Hans Müller-Schlösser (born 14 June 1884 in Düsseldorf; died 21 March 1956 in Düsseldorf) was a German poet and playwright closely associated with his native city of Düsseldorf. Müller-Schlösser is best known for his 1913 play Wibbel the Tailor, which inspired a 1938 opera by Mark Lothar and a number of film adaptations including Wibbel the Tailor (1931) directed by and starring Paul Henckels.

References

Bibliography
 Grange, William. Cultural Chronicle of the Weimar Republic. Scarecrow Press, 2008.

External links

Writers from Düsseldorf
1884 births
1956 deaths
German male poets
German male dramatists and playwrights
20th-century German poets
20th-century German dramatists and playwrights
20th-century German male writers